Owen Reilly (born 21 January 1937) is a British boxer. He competed in the men's bantamweight event at the 1956 Summer Olympics.

Reilly won the 1956 Amateur Boxing Association British bantamweight title, when boxing out of the Royal Air Force BC.

References

External links
 

1937 births
Living people
British male boxers
Olympic boxers of Great Britain
Boxers at the 1956 Summer Olympics
Boxers from Glasgow
Bantamweight boxers